The Montenegrin Women's Handball Cup (Montenegrin: Crnogorski rukometni kup za žene) is a national women's team handball competition in Montenegro operated by the Handball Federation of Montenegro. It has been held annually since Montenegrin independence in 2006.

History

Before independence 
Before Montenegrin independence, clubs from that Republic played in handball Cup of Yugoslavia / Serbia and Montenegro. Most successful was ŽRK Budućnost Podgorica with 11 trophies won.
ŽRK Budućnost won the national Cup on seasons 1983–84, 1988–89, 1994–95, 1995–96, 1996–97, 1997–98, 1999-00, 2000–01, 2001–02, 2004–05, 2005–06.

After independence 
Except Montenegrin First League of Women's Handball as a top-tier league competition, after the independence, Handball Federation of Montenegro established Montenegrin Cup as a second elite national tournament. Inaugural season of Montenegrin Cup was 2006-07, and by now all the titles are won by ŽRK Budućnost.

Winners

Season by season
Below is a list of Montenegrin Cup winners since the season 2006-07.

Trophies by Club

See also 
 Montenegrin First League of Women's Handball
 Montenegrin women's handball clubs in European competitions
 Montenegrin Men's Handball Cup

External links 
Handball Federation of Montenegro

Cup, Montenegrin Women's Handball
Women's handball competitions